Odd Times is a live album by the Lebanese oud player and composer Rabih Abou-Khalil  which was recorded in Germany in  1997 and released on the Enja label.

Reception

The Allmusic review by Kurt Keefner stated "Odd Times is Rabih Abou-Khalil's first live album. Since it would be impractical to assemble all of the guests he has had on his albums over the years, Abou-Khalil has gone in the other direction and pared his ensemble down to what is for him the bare bones ... Most live albums contain well-known pieces from the artist's studio repertoire; in contrast, Odd Times is mostly new material. In general, the album is a mix of shapeless, overlong attempts at atmosphere  and fairly bouncy and fun items ... The pared-down lineup is engaging because Abou-Khalil's oud and Godard's tuba are more prominent; unfortunately, Levy's harmonica is also pronounced, and simply clashes with the entire project of fusing Arabic music and jazz".

Track listing
All compositions by Rabih Abou-Khalil
 "The Sphinx and I" – 5:44
 "Dr. Gieler's Prescription" – 5:15
 "Elephant Hips" – 10:15
 "Q-Tips" – 4:34
 "Son of Ben Hur" – 11:29
 "The Happy Sheik" – 9:32
 "One Of Those Days" – 10:31
 "Rabou-Abou-Kabou" – 6:52

Personnel
Rabih Abou-Khalil – oud, bass oud
Howard Levy – harmonica
Michel Godard – tuba, serpent
Mark Nauseef – drums
Nabil Khaiat – frame drums

References

Rabih Abou-Khalil live albums
1997 live albums
Enja Records live albums